TV9 Mongolia, or TV9, 2003 founded is a television broadcasting station in Mongolia. It is owned by Enkhtuya Nambar.

It is the largest private TV station in Mongolia behind the state-owned Mongolian National Broadcaster. TV9 became the first channel in Mongolia to broadcast 24 hours a day. It has contracted correspondents in all 21 aimags.

Radio
TV-9 operates a radio station on FM 103.6. It broadcasts special musical programs, news programs, sport programs, shows and events, and training and scientific individual programs.

Public relations
TV9 is a member of The Asia-Pacific Broadcasting Union (ABU), and also works with some international television stations such as Beijing TV, Hasag TV, Reuters, Russia 1, NTV, and Hulunbeir TV in Inner Mongolia.

TV9 has a relationship with USAID, with a goal to support countryside life and their small businesses.

See also
Media of Mongolia
Communications in Mongolia

References

External links
Official site 

Television companies of Mongolia
Television channels and stations established in 2007